Staude is a surname. Notable people with the surname include:
 Christoph Staude (born 1965), German composer
 Keanu Staude (born 1997), German footballer
  (1857–1928), German mathematician

German-language surnames